Back to Front was a two-year concert tour by Peter Gabriel, a retrospective performance based on every song from his 1986 multi-platinum album So played in sequence. The backing band included musicians that Gabriel toured with in 1986–1987 in support of the album's initial release.

Each night of the tour was recorded and released both separately and as part of a box set entitled Back to Front: Encore Series. The releases were limited editions and available exclusively from Gabriel's official website.

On 23 June 2014, Real World Records and Eagle Rock Entertainment released the live album and film Back to Front: Live in London, recorded at the O2 concerts.

Gabriel played new original songs, "O But" and "What Lies Ahead", during the tour. John Cusack appeared at the 6 October 2012 concert in Los Angeles, recreating a scene from Say Anything....

Dave McKenna of The Washington Post' described the 14 October 2012 concert in Fairfax as "great".

Tour band
 Peter Gabriel – vocals, piano, keyboard, tambourine
 David Rhodes – guitar and backing vocals
 Tony Levin – bass guitar, upright bass, synthesizer, backing vocals
 David Sancious – keyboards, accordion, acoustic guitar
 Manu Katché – drums, shaker
  Jennie Abrahamson – backing vocals, tambourine, 12 string acoustic guitar
 Linnea Olsson – backing vocals, synthesizer, cello

Tour crew
 Tour manager: Dave Taraskevics
 Lighting designer: Rob Sinclair

Set listAcoustic (with house lights left on): "Daddy Long Legs" (new unfinished song, also known as "O But", replaced by new unfinished song "What Lies Ahead" in late 2014, released as Playing For Time in 2023 with a full band and orchestral arrangement.)
 "Come Talk to Me"
 "Shock the Monkey"
 "Family Snapshot"Electric: "Digging in the Dirt"
 "Secret World"
 "The Family and the Fishing Net" or "Darkness" (December 2014)
 "No Self Control"
 "Games Without Frontiers" (in Herning and Amsterdam only)
 "Solsbury Hill" (played after "Washing of the Water" for first show in Quebec City)
 "Washing of the Water" or "Humdrum" (2012 tour), "Why Don't You Show Yourself" (2013 and 2014 tours)So: "Red Rain"
 "Sledgehammer"
 "Don't Give Up"
 "That Voice Again"
 "Mercy Street"
 "Big Time"
 "We Do What We're Told (Milgram's 37)"
 "This Is the Picture (Excellent Birds)"
 "In Your Eyes"Encore:'
 "Here Comes the Flood" (played 11 times in mid 2014)
 "The Tower That Ate People"
 "Biko"

Tour dates

 Cancellations and rescheduled shows

References

External links
 Tour and rehearsal photos from Tony Levin

Peter Gabriel concert tours
2012 concert tours
2013 concert tours
2014 concert tours